Serjik Teymourian (29 May 1974 – 29 August 2020) was an Armenian-Iranian footballer who played as a defensive midfielder for Esteghlal and German club 1. FSV Mainz 05.

Career
Teymourian was a product of Ararat Tehran and joined Esteghlal academy in 1993. Then he played three seasons for Esteghlal's junior squad. He joined 1. FSV Mainz 05 in summer 1998 but was released by the club at the end of the 1999–2000 season. He was the elder brother of Andranik Teymourian and was his agent.

Death
On 12 July 2020, Teymourian had an accident after a vehicle crashed into his motorcycle. He went into a coma and was hospitalised in northern Tehran. On 29 August 2020, Teymourian died at the age of 46.

Career statistics

Honours
Esteghlal
Azadegan League: 1998–99
Hazfi Cup: 1995–96

References

External links
Serjik Teymourian Mainz Profile at fsv05.de

1974 births
2020 deaths
People from Tehran
Iranian footballers
Ethnic Armenian sportspeople
Association football midfielders
F.C. Ararat Tehran players
Esteghlal F.C. players
1. FSV Mainz 05 players
Iranian people of Armenian descent
2. Bundesliga players
Iranian expatriate footballers
Iranian expatriate sportspeople in Germany
Expatriate footballers in Germany
Road incident deaths in Iran